Kapil Nirmal  is an Indian television actor who is best known for his portrayal of Yudhishthir Sisodia (also known as Kunwar Yudhishthir) in the Star Plus serial Raja Ki Aayegi Baraat.

Career 
Kapil Nirmal began his acting career with ETV Rajasthan's show, Ina Meena Dika, then he appeared in the television film, Roop Ki Rani. Kapil then shifted to Mumbai where he worked with Reliance Big Pictures. His first break as a lead happened with the show Shakira where he portrayed police officer ACP Abhay Singh on the Bindass channel. After which he portrayed the much loved role of Kunwar Yudhishthir in the daily Star Plus show Raja Ki Aayegi Baraat. He has participated in the season 4 of Nach Baliye 4 with Anjali Abrol and was also a part of the second season of Zara Nachke Dikha. He had a guest appearance in  Tere Liye as a part of the Durga Puja celebration. He played the character of Sarjerao im Pardes Mein Mila Koi Apna. Later he went on to play the role of Surya Rana Singh in the  Na Aana Is Des Laado. He was also seen in Ek Veer Ki Ardaas...Veera as Nihaal Singh, Box Cricket League as part of Ahmedabad Express and Bhootu as Vikram.

He has made an appearance in Javed Ali's music album Yaara.

Television

Television

References

Indian male television actors
Living people
Male actors from Jaipur
Indian male soap opera actors
21st-century Indian male actors
Year of birth missing (living people)